Raúl Andrés Muñoz Mardones (born 25 May 1975) is a Chilean retired footballer who played as a left back.

Club career
Muñoz was born in Curicó, Maule Region. As a child, he was with Escuela de Fútbol Municipal de Curicó (Municipal Football Academy of Curicó), later named Juventud 2000, what was founded by the former professional footballer Luis Hernán Álvarez. During his ten-year professional career he played in his country for Unión Santa Cruz, Santiago Wanderers, Colo-Colo (two stints) and Audax Italiano – where he retired at only 29 – also having abroad spells in Spain (CD Numancia), Russia (PFC Krylia Sovetov Samara) and Mexico (San Luis FC).

International career
Muñoz earned seven caps for Chile, his debut coming on 2 April 1997 in a friendly against Brazil. He was selected in the squad for that year's Copa América. In addition, he played for Chile B twice: in the 2–1 win against England B on 10 February 1998, and in the 0–1 loss against Catalonia on 28 December 2001.

Honours

Club
Santiago Wanderers
 Segunda División de Chile (1): 1995

Colo-Colo
 Primera División de Chile (3): 1997, 1998, 2002 Clausura

References

External links

1975 births
Living people
People from Curicó
Chilean footballers
Association football defenders
Chilean Primera División players
Primera B de Chile players
Deportes Santa Cruz footballers
Santiago Wanderers footballers
Colo-Colo footballers
Audax Italiano footballers
La Liga players
CD Numancia players
Russian Premier League players
PFC Krylia Sovetov Samara players
Liga MX players
San Luis F.C. players
Chile international footballers
1997 Copa América players
Chilean expatriate footballers
Expatriate footballers in Spain
Expatriate footballers in Russia
Expatriate footballers in Mexico
Chilean expatriate sportspeople in Spain
Chilean expatriate sportspeople in Russia
Chilean expatriate sportspeople in Mexico